Blind Man is a 2012 French thriller film directed by Xavier Palud.

Cast 
 Jacques Gamblin as Commandant Lassalle
 Lambert Wilson as Narvik
 Raphaëlle Agogué as Héloïse 
 Arnaud Cosson as Vermulen
 Antoine Levannier as Simon
 Frédéric Kontogom as Briand
 Pascal Demolon as Warnas

References

External links 

2012 thriller films
2012 films
2010s French-language films
French thriller films
2010s French films